The Mayor of Sucre is the head of the municipal government of Sucre municipality, located in Chuquisaca department of Bolivia. The office is elected for a term of five years by general election.

The current mayor of Sucre is Iván Arciénega, who defeated former mayor Jaime Barrón Poveda in elections held on March 30, 2015; he took office on May 25.

References